Ernst Kurth (1 June 1886, in Vienna – 2 August 1946, in Bern) was a Swiss music theorist of Austrian origin.

Career 

Kurth studied musicology with Guido Adler (a student of Bruckner and Hanslick) in Vienna, and earned his Ph.D. (1908) with a thesis about Christoph Willibald Gluck's operatic style. In a relatively short publishing career of about 15 years, Kurth wrote four enormously influential works: Grundlagen des Linearen Kontrapunkts (Foundations of Linear Counterpoint), Romantische Harmonik und ihre Krise in Wagners "Tristan" (Romantic Harmony and its Crisis in Wagner's "Tristan"), Bruckner, and Musikpsychologie. Since the 1940s, Kurth was gradually eclipsed by other theorists (notably Heinrich Schenker). However, his concept of "developmental motif" has remained influential. A developmental motif is one which gradually changes or grows, becoming a structural carrier of formal developments. An example is the triadic motif heard at the beginning of the first movement of Beethovens' third symphony which only becomes a closed theme at the culminating closing of the movement. Unfortunately, only a small selection of excerpts from Kurth's writings was translated into English by Lee A. Rothfarb.

Writings 

Der Stil der opera seria von Gluck bis zum Orfeo, (diss., U. of Vienna, 1908; published as Die Jugendopern Glucks bis Orfeo, SMw, i (1913), 193–277)
Kritische Bemerkungen zum V. Kapitel der 'Ars cantus mensurabilis' des Franko von Köln, KJb, xxi (1908), 39–47
Die Voraussetzungen der theoretischen Harmonik und der tonalen Darstellungssysteme (Habilitationsschrift, U. of Berne, 1912; Berne, 1913/R)
Grundlagen des linearen Kontrapunkts: Einführung in Stil und Technik von Bachs melodischer Polyphonie (Berne, 1917, 5/1956/R)
Zur Motivbildung Bachs, BJb 1917, 80–136
Romantische Harmonik und ihre Krise in Wagners 'Tristan''' (Berne, 1920/R, 2/1923/R; Russ. trans., 1975)Bruckner (Berlin, 1925/R)Die Schulmusik und ihre Reform, SMz, lxx (1930), 297–304Musikpsychologie (Berlin, 1931/R, 2/1947)Ernst Kurth: Selected Writings, ed. and trans. Rothfarb (New York, 1991)

 Literature 

E. Bücken: "Kurth als Musiktheoretiker", Melos, iv (1924–5), 358–64
H. Eimert: Bekenntnis und Methode', ZMw, ix (1926–7), 99–127
J. Handschin: "De différentes conceptions de Bach", Schweizerisches Jb für Musikwissenschaft, iv (1929), 7–35
D. Menstell Hsu: "Ernst Kurth and his Concept of Music as Motion", JMT, x (1966), 2–17
C. Dahlhaus: Untersuchungen über die Entstehung der harmonischen Tonalität (Kassel, 1968; Eng. trans., 1990)
W. Seidel: Über Rhythmustheorien der Neuzeit (Berne and Munich, 1975)
B. Billeter: "Der Briefwechsel Albert Schweitzer-Ernst Kurth", Festschrift Hans Conradin, ed. V. Kalisch (Bern and Stuttgart, 1983), 233–46
J. Willimann, ed.: Schweizer Jb für Musikwissenschaft, new ser., vi–vii (1986–7) [memorial issue]
L.A. Rothfarb: Ernst Kurth as Theorist and Analyst (Philadelphia, 1988)
Ernst Kurth: Selected Writings, ed. and trans. L.A. Rothfarb (New York, 1991)
L. Schader: Ernst Kurths 'Grundlagen des linearen Kontrapunkts' und die Rezeption der Schrift in den zwanziger Jahren (diss., U. of Frankfurt, 2000)

References

External links

 Grundlagen des Linearen Kontrapunkts in DJVU
 Ernst Kurth, Selected Writings by Lee A. Rothfarb

1886 births
1946 deaths
Swiss music theorists
20th-century musicologists
Austrian emigrants to Switzerland